Alf Simensen (9 December 1896 – 4 December 1983) was a Norwegian footballer. He played in three matches for the Norway national football team from 1918 to 1926.

References

External links
 

1896 births
1983 deaths
Norwegian footballers
Norway international footballers
Place of birth missing
Association footballers not categorized by position